Dicraeanthus is a genus of flowering plants belonging to the family Podostemaceae.

Its native range is Western and Western Central Tropical Africa.

Species:

Dicraeanthus africanus 
Dicraeanthus ramosus 
Dicraeanthus zehnderi

References

Podostemaceae
Malpighiales genera